Seletto is a surname. Notable people with the surname include:

Alain Seletto (born 1977), Italian ski mountaineer and alpine skier
Erik Seletto (born 1975), Italian alpine skier